Euphorbia bupleurifolia, commonly known as cycad spurge or pine cone plant, is a species of plant in the family Euphorbiaceae. 

It is native to southern Africa. It is found in the South African regions of Cape Provinces and KwaZulu-Natal.

The Latin specific epithet of bupleurifolia refers to means ‘with leaves like those of the genus Bupleurum’, a large genus in the Apiaceae (carrot family), commonly called Hare's Ear. The genus name Bupleurum is also an ancient Greek word for ‘umbelliferous plant’. It was first described and published in Pl. Hort. Schoenbr. Vol.1 on page 55 in 1797.

References 

bupleurifolia
bupleurifolia
Plants described in 1797
Flora of the Cape Provinces
Flora of KwaZulu-Natal